Shegodskaya is a rural locality (a village) in Simskoye Rural Settlement, Yuryev-Polsky District, Vladimir Oblast, Russia. The population was 3 as of 2010.

Geography 
Shegodskaya is located on the Seleksha River, 19 km north of Yuryev-Polsky (the district's administrative centre) by road. Shegodskoye is the nearest rural locality.

References 

Rural localities in Yuryev-Polsky District